The women's 200 metre breaststroke competition of the swimming events at the 1995 Pan American Games took place between March 12–17 at the Complejo Natatorio. The last Pan American Games champion was Dorsey Tierney of the United States.

This race consisted of four lengths of the pool, all in breaststroke.

Results
All times are in minutes and seconds.

Heats

Final 
The final was held between March 12–17.

References

Swimming at the 1995 Pan American Games
1995 in women's swimming